Tuzlubino (Toźlowba) is a rural locality (a village) in Kuntugushevsky Selsoviet, Baltachevsky District, Bashkortostan, Russia. The population was 245 as of 2010. There are 4 streets.

Geography 
Tuzlubino is located 4 km southeast of Starobaltachevo (the district's administrative centre) by road. Starobaltachevo is the nearest rural locality.

References 

Rural localities in Baltachevsky District